Olga Konstantinovna Chekhova (14 April 1897 – 9 March 1980), known in Germany as Olga Tschechowa, was a Russian-German actress. Her film roles include the female lead in Alfred Hitchcock's Mary (1931).

Biography 

Olga Konstantinovna Knipper was born on 14 April 1897, the daughter of Konstantin Knipper (1868–1929), a railway engineer, and Yelena Luise "Lulu" Knipper (née Ried, 1874–1940), both Lutherans of ethnic German ancestry.
 Olga was the niece and namesake of Olga Knipper (Anton Chekhov's wife). She went to school in Tsarskoye Selo but, after watching Eleonora Duse, joined the Moscow Art Theatre's studio. There she met the Russian-Jewish actor Mikhail Chekhov (Anton's nephew) in 1914 and married him the same year, taking his surname as her own. Their daughter, also named Olga, was born in 1916. She became an actress under the name of Ada Tschechowa.

During the year of the 1917 October Revolution, Chekhova divorced her husband but kept his name. In the first year of the revolution, she joined a cabaret-theatre group called Sorokonozhka (The Little Centipede), as the troupe consisted of twenty members and only forty feet. Chekhova also was given a part in a silent movie, Anya Kraeva. The following year, in 1918, she was given roles in Cagliostro and in The Last Adventure of Arsène Lupin. Although part of the social circle around the Moscow Art Theatre, she never played a role there, despite her later claims to having her first theatre role in The Cherry Orchard.

She managed to get a travel passport from the Soviet government, possibly in exchange for her cooperation, which led to permission to leave Russia. She was accompanied by a Soviet agent on a train to Vienna, then she moved to Berlin in 1920. That same year, she married Frederick Yaroshi, though they divorced in 1921. Her first cinema role in Germany was in F. W. Murnau silent movie Schloß Vogelöd (1921). She played in Max Reinhardt's productions at UFA. She made the successful transition from silent film to talkies. In the 1930s, she rose to become one of the brightest stars of the Third Reich and was admired by Adolf Hitler. She appeared in such films as The Hymn of Leuthen although she preferred comedies. In 1936 she married for the third time, to Marcel Robbins, which ended in divorce in 1938.

Joseph Goebbels 
A published photograph of her sitting beside Hitler at a reception gave the leaders of the Soviet intelligence service the impression that she had close contacts with Hitler. She had more contact with the Minister of Propaganda, Joseph Goebbels, who referred to her in his diaries as "eine charmante Frau" ("a charming lady").

She is also rumored to have been a communist spy in a Soviet conspiracy. According to the book Killing Hitler (2006) by the British author Roger Moorhouse, she was pressured by Stalin and Beria to flirt with Adolf Hitler in order to gain and transfer information so that Hitler could be killed by secret Soviet agents.

Later years 

Olga achieved great success in the motion picture industry. Her filmography includes 138 credits as an actor, director, and producer between 1917 and 1974. After the war she lived in the Soviet sector of Berlin, but eventually she managed to escape from her Soviet contacts. In 1949, she moved to Munich, Bavaria, and launched a cosmetics company, Olga Tschechowa Kosmetik.

At the same time she continued acting, and played supporting roles and cameos in more than 20 films. She largely retired from acting in the 70s, after publishing a book of memoirs. Her correspondence with Russian actresses Olga Knipper and Alla Tarasova was published posthumously.

Her niece Marina Ried and granddaughter Vera Tschechowa also became actresses.

Selected filmography 

 Anya Kraeva (1917)
 Poslednie priklucheniya Arsena Lupena (1918)
 Kaliostro (1918)
 Schloß Vogelöd (1921) - Baronin Safferstätt
 Impostor (1921)
 Violet (1921) - Violet
 The Circle of Death (1922) - Olga Petrowna
 Der Kampf ums Ich (1922)
 Nora (1923) - Nora
 The Pagoda (1923)
 Certificates of Death (1923)
 Tatjana (1923) - Tatjana
 The Lost Shoe (1923) - Estella
 Debit and Credit (1924) - Sabine
 The Enchantress (1924)
 The Venus of Montmartre (1925) - Gräfin Sullivan
 The City of Temptation (1925)
 The Old Ballroom (1925, part 1, 2)
 Should We Get Married? (1925)
 Love Story (1925)
 The Company Worth Millions (1925)
 The Fallen (1926) - Malwa, Freundin von Hammer
 The Mill at Sanssouci (1926) - Tänzerin Barberina
 Der Mann aus dem Jenseits (1926) - Seine Frau
 The Schimeck Family (1926) - Olga, seine Frau
 Trude (1926)
 The Man in the Fire (1926) - Diva Romola
 His Toughest Case (1926) - Mary Melton
 Grandstand for General Staff (1926) - Gräfin Landieren
 Aftermath (1926)
 The Italian Straw Hat (1927)
 The Sea (1927) - Rosseherre
 His Late Excellency (1927) - Baronin von Windegg
 The Italian Straw Hat (1928) - Anaïs de Beauperthuis
 Moulin Rouge (1928) - Parysia
 Pawns of Passion (1928) - Ala Suminska
 Woman in Flames (1928) - Gräfin Clarissa Thalberg
 After the Verdict (1929) - Vivian Denys
 Diane (1929) - Diane Mervil
 The Love of the Brothers Rott (1929) - Theresa Donath
 Der Narr seiner Liebe (1929)
 Incest (1929) - Lisbeth Kröger - deren Tochter aus erster Ehe
 Stud. chem. Helene Willfüer (1930) - Helene Willfüer
 Love in the Ring (1930) - Lilian
 Troika (1930) - Vera Walowa
 Der Detektiv des Kaisers (1930) - Olga
 The Three from the Filling Station (1930) - Edith von Turoff
 Darling of the Gods (1930) - Olga von Dagomirska
 Zwei Krawatten (1930) - Mabel
 The Road to Paradise (1930) - Edith de Tourkoff
 A Girl from the Reeperbahn (1930) - Hanne Bullová
 The Great Longing (1930) - Herself
 Liebe auf Befehl (1931) - Manuela
 Mary (1931) - Mary Baring
 Panic in Chicago (1931) - Florence Dingley
 The Night of Decision (1931) - Maria Iwanowa (Marya Sablin)
 The Concert (1931) - Maria Heink, Gattin
 Night Convoy (1932) - Inka Maria, seine Frau
 Trenck (1932) - Elisabeth, Zarin von Rußland
 The Gala Performance (1932) - Miß Harris
 The Hymn of Leuthen (1933) - Gräfin Mariann
 Liebelei (1933) - Baronin v. Eggersdorff
 A Love Story (1933) - Baronin von Eggersdorf
 Ways to a Good Marriage (1933) - Claire Veiler, die unbefriedigte Frau
 Ein gewisser Herr Gran (1933) - Frau Mervin
 Un certain monsieur Grant (1933) - Mme Merwin - une espionne
 The Country Schoolmaster (1933) - Teresa van der Straaten
 Um ein bisschen Glück (1933) - Helene, seine Frau
 Police Report (1934) - Gisela Ostercamp
 Between Two Hearts (1934) - Inge Leuthoff
 L'amour qu'il faut aux femmes (1934) - Le troisième couple
 The World Without a Mask (1934) - Betty Bandelow
 Maskerade (1934) - Anita Keller - seine Braut
 What Am I Without You (1934) - Lilly Petrowa, Schauspielerin
 Abenteuer eines jungen Herrn in Polen (1934) - Gräfin Lubenska
 Peer Gynt (1934) - Baronin
 Regine (1935) - Floris Bell, Schauspielerin
 Asew (1935) - Tanja Asew, seine Frau
 The Eternal Mask (1935) - Madame Negar
 Rêve d'Amour (1935) - Gräfin Madeleine Duday
 Artist Love (1935) - Olivia Vanderhagen
 Ein Walzer um den Stephansturm (1935) - Sylvia von Polonska
 The Empress's Favourite (1936) - Elisabeth Kaiserin von Russland
 L'argent (1936) - Baronne Sandorff
 Manja Valewska (1936) - Gräfin Pola Valewska
 His Daughter is Called Peter (1936) - Nora Noir
 Hannerl and Her Lovers (1936) - Frau von Stahl
 Court Theatre (1936) - Baroness Seebach
 Petersburger Romanze (1936)
 Die weissen Teufel (1936)
 Liebe geht seltsame Wege (1937) - Antonia Delvarez
 Unter Ausschluß der Öffentlichkeit (1937) - Brigitte Sparrenberg
 Die gelbe Flagge (1937) - Helen Roeder - amerikanische Journalistin
 Gewitterflug zu Claudia (1937) - Frau Mainburg
 Das Mädchen mit dem guten Ruf (1938) - Mirandolina
 Red Orchids (1938) - Maria Dorando
 Zwei Frauen (1938) - Paula Corvey
 Verliebtes Abenteuer (1938) - Olivia
 The Stars Shine (1938) - Herself
 Bel Ami (1939) - Madeleine Forestier
 Ich verweigere die Aussage (1939) - Nora Ottendorf
 Parkstraße 13 (1939) - Evelyne Schratt
 Die unheimlichen Wünsche (1939) - Feodora, Schauspielerin
 Liberated Hands (1939) - Kerstin Thomas
 Passion (1940) - Gerda
 Angelika (1940) - Angelika
 The Fox of Glenarvon (1940) - Gloria Grandison
 Menschen im Sturm (1941) - Vera seine Frau
 Andreas Schlüter (1942) - Gräfin Vera Orlewska
 With the Eyes of a Woman (1942) - Marie-Louise v. Ditmar, Baronin von Stein
 The Eternal Tone (1943) - Josephine Malti, Singer
 Reise in die Vergangenheit (1943) - Marianne von der Halden
 Gefährlicher Frühling (1943) - Juliane von Buckwitz
 Melusine (1944) - Nora
 In the Temple of Venus (1948) - Carola Weber
 One Night Apart (1950) - Vera, seine Frau
 Kein Engel ist so rein (1950) - Margot
 Two in One Suit (1950) - Catherine Turner
  (1950) - Susanne de Bogne - Journalistin
 Trouble in Paradise (1950) - Myriam Esneh
 The Man Who Wanted to Live Twice (1950) - Irene Hesse
 Begierde (1951) - Frau des Bankpräsidenten
 Eine Frau mit Herz (1951) - Vera von Wesener
 Das Geheimnis einer Ehe (1951) - Tina Camphausen
 My Friend the Thief (1951) - Percys Schwester
 Behind Monastery Walls (1952) - Priorin
 Everything for Father (1953) - Frau von Pleskow
 Rose-Girl Resli (1953) - Mrs. von Weidersheim
 Heute nacht passiert's (1953) - HImself - Gast im Modesalon
 Captain Wronski (1954) - Frau von Eichhoff
 I Was an Ugly Girl (1955) - Luise Raymond
 The Barrings (1955) - Amelie von Eyff
 U 47 – Kapitänleutnant Prien (1958) - Die Fürstin
 Jack and Jenny (1963) - Mutter Johannsen
 The Twins from Immenhof (1973) - Großmutter Arkens
 Spring in Immenhof (1974) - Großmutter (final film role)

References

Further reading

External links 

 
 Biography and photos
 Photographs and bibliography
 Booknotes interview with Antony Beevor on The Mystery Of Olga Chekhova, October 24, 2004.

1897 births
1980 deaths
People from Gyumri
People from Erivan Governorate
People from the Russian Empire of German descent
German film actresses
German silent film actresses
NKVD
Soviet emigrants to Germany
Soviet actresses
Actresses from the Russian Empire
Commanders Crosses of the Order of Merit of the Federal Republic of Germany
20th-century German actresses